Sialkot Cantonment Airport is a small army airport for Mushshak and Cessna planes and helicopters in Sialkot, Punjab, Pakistan. It is located on Cantonment Road adjacent to Garrison Park. During 1995–1996, it was also used as a public airport for Pakistan International Airlines helicopter service from and to Islamabad.

See also 
 List of airports in Pakistan
 Pakistan Army
 Sialkot International Airport
 Sialkot
 Sialkot Cantonment

Airports in Punjab, Pakistan
Transport in Sialkot
Buildings and structures in Sialkot